Richard Haden Gordon (1844-1917) was an American Confederate veteran, pharmacist and politician. He served as a member of the Tennessee House of Representatives.

Early life
Gordon was born on September 6, 1844 in Maury County, Tennessee. His father, Powhatan Gordon, was a politician.

Career
During the American Civil War of 1861–1865, he joined in the Confederate States Army and served in the First Battle of Bull Run and the Battle of Shiloh.

After the war, Gordon worked as a pharmacist and served as the Tennessee State Board of Pharmacy. He also served as a member of the Tennessee House of Representatives. After he moved to New York City, he continued to be a pharmacist there. He also served as a major of the United Confederate Veterans and vice president of the Tennessee Society of New York.

Personal and death
Gordon married Eleanora Cunningham on October 15, 1868. They had two sons, George Cunningham Gordon and Richard Haden Gordon, and three daughters, Ann McClelland Gordon, Carolyn Gordon and Eleanora Gordon.

Gordon died on November 26, 1917 in New York City.

References

1844 births
1917 deaths
American people of Scottish descent
People from Maury County, Tennessee
Politicians from New York City
Confederate States Army personnel
Members of the Tennessee House of Representatives